Ángel Guillermo Benítez (born 8 December 1993) is an Argentine-born Paraguayan professional footballer who plays as a left-back for Huracán, on loan from Guaraní.

Career
Benítez is the son of Paraguayan immigrants for which he has dual citizenship.
Benítez made his Argentinos Juniors debut in 2013 in a Copa Argentina tie against Sportivo Belgrano, playing the full match in penalty shoot-out defeat. In June 2014, Benítez joined Primera B Metropolitana side Estudiantes on loan for two seasons. His first professional league appearance came on 8 August in a 1–0 win over Deportivo Merlo. He went onto play eleven times for Estudiantes during the 2014 campaign, prior to featuring in forty fixtures in 2015. In May 2015, Benítez scored his first career goal versus Deportivo Armenio. He made his Argentine Primera División debut for Argentinos on 6 February 2016 in a draw with Tigre.

After getting relegated in that season, he subsequently played thirty-six times for the club in the 2016–17 Primera B Nacional season as Argentinos won the title and gained promotion. His 100th career appearance arrived on 28 January 2018 in a 2–0 win versus San Martín. Benítez departed Argentine football for the opening time in June 2018, after being loaned to Guaraní of the Paraguayan Primera División. He remained on loan until May 2020, when he was signed permanently by the club he had made forty-five appearances for in the previous two years. In December, Benítez signed a new contract through to 2024. On 30 June 2022, Benítez returned to Argentina, as he signed on loan for Huracán until June 2023 with a purchase option of $300,000.

Career statistics
.

Honours
Argentinos Juniors
Primera B Nacional: 2016–17

References

External links

1993 births
Living people
Argentine footballers
Argentine expatriate footballers
Footballers from Buenos Aires
Association football fullbacks
Argentine Primera División players
Primera Nacional players
Primera B Metropolitana players
Paraguayan Primera División players
Argentinos Juniors footballers
Estudiantes de Buenos Aires footballers
Club Guaraní players
Club Atlético Huracán footballers
Argentine expatriate sportspeople in Paraguay
Expatriate footballers in Paraguay
Argentine sportspeople of Paraguayan descent